Durnin is a surname. Notable people with the surname include:

 John Durnin (Scottish footballer) (1894–?)
 John Durnin (born 1965), British footballer
 Pat Durnin (born 1959), Canadian speed skater

See also
 Durbin (surname)
 Durning